The Pomeranian Voivodeship or Pomorskie Voivodeship was an administrative unit of interwar Poland (from 1919 to 1939). It ceased to function in September 1939, following the German and Soviet invasion of Poland.

Most of the territory of Pomeranian province became part of the current Kuyavian-Pomeranian Voivodeship, of which one of two capitals is the same as the interwar voivodeship's Toruń; the second one is Bydgoszcz.

The name Pomerania derives from the Slavic po more, meaning "by the sea" or "on the sea".

History 

This was a unit of administration and local government in the Republic of Poland (II Rzeczpospolita) established in 1919 after World War I from the majority of the Prussian province of West Prussia (made out of territories taken in Partitions of Poland which was returned to Poland. Toruń was the capital. In 1938–1939, the voivodeship extended to the south at the expense of Poznań Voivodeship and Warsaw Voivodeship, and was called Great Pomerania afterwards (see: Territorial changes of Polish Voivodeships on April 1, 1938).

During World War II, it was occupied by Nazi Germany and unilaterally annexed as Reichsgau Danzig-Westpreussen ("Reich province of Danzig-West Prussia"). Poles and Jews were classified as untermenschen by German authorities and their intended fate slavery and extermination. In 1945, the region was returned to Poland. In 1945 out of its northern territory, the new voivodeship of Gdańsk was formed, including annexed territories of the Free City of Danzig and of German Prussian Province of Pomerania and German Prussian Province of East Prussia. The bulk of the old voivodeship was enlarged by annexed territories of the German Prussian Province of Pomerania and later renamed into Bydgoszcz voivodeship. In the years 1975–1998, it was reorganized into the voivodeships of Gdańsk, Elbląg, Bydgoszcz, Toruń, and Włocławek.

Area and counties 

Between April 1, 1938 and September 1, 1939, the Voivodeship's area was 25 683 km2, and its population - 1 884 400 (according to the 1931 census). It consisted of 28 powiats (counties), 64 cities, and 234 villages. Railroad density was high, with 11.4 km. per 100 km2 (total length of railroads within the Voivodeship's area was 1 887 km., second in the whole country). Forests covered 26.7% of the voivodeship, which was higher than the national average (in 1937, the average was 22.2%).

Pomorskie Voivodeship was one of the richest and best developed in interwar Poland. With numerous cities and well-developed rail, it also provided the country with access to the Baltic Sea. Only 8.3% of population was illiterate, which was much lower than the national average of 23.1% (as for 1931). Poles made up majority of population (88%). 
After World War I, the number of Germans was 117,251 in 1926 and 107,555 in 1934. As of 1931 10.1% of the populace were ethnic Germans and 1.6% Jews.

This is the list of the Pomorskie Voivodeship counties as of August 31, 1939:

 Brodnica county (area 913 km2, pop. 56 300),
 city of Bydgoszcz county (area 75 km2, pop. 117 200),
 Bydgoszcz county (area 1 334 km2, pop. 58 100),
 Chełmno county (area 738 km2, pop. 52 800),
 Chojnice county (area 1 854 km2, pop. 76 900),
 city of Gdynia county (area 66 km2, pop. 38 600),
 city of Grudziądz county (area 28 km2, pop. 54 000),
 Grudziądz county (area 758 km2, pop. 42 800),
 city of Inowrocław county (area 37 km2, pop. 34 400),
 Inowrocław county (area 1 267 km2, pop. 67 500),
 Kartuzy county (area 1 302 km2, pop. 68 700),
 Kościerzyna county (area 1 162 km2, pop. 51 700),
 Lipno county (area 1 535 km2, pop. 104 500),
 Lubawa county (area 833 km2, pop. 53 600),
 Nieszawa county (area 1 278 km2, pop. 117 900),
 Rypin county (area 1 188 km2, pop. 84 900),
 Sępólno Krajeńskie county (area 681 km2, pop. 31 600),
 Starogard Gdański county (area 1 127 km2, pop. 71 800),
 Szubin county (area 917 km2, pop. 47 800),
 Świecie county (area 1 533 km2, pop. 88 000),
 Tczew county (area 716 km2, pop. 67 400),
 city of Toruń county (area 59 km2, pop. 61 900),
 Toruń county (area 864 km2, pop. 52 300),
 Tuchola county (area 1 039 km2, pop. 41 200),
 Maritime County (area 673 km2, pop. 49 900),
 Wejherowo county (area 1 281 km2, pop. 79 900),
 Włocławek county (area 1 325 km2, pop. 147 800),
 Wyrzysk county (area 1 101 km2, pop. 64 900).

Main cities 

Biggest cities of the Voivodeship were (data according to the 1931 Polish census):

 Bydgoszcz (pop. 117 200) - since 1938
 Toruń (pop. 61 900) - the capital
 Włocławek (pop. 56 000) - since 1938
 Grudziądz (pop. 54 000)
 Gdynia (pop. 38 600)
 Inowrocław (pop. 34 400) - since 1938
 Tczew (pop. 22 500)
 Chojnice (pop. 14 100)

German minority 

According to Polish census figures, the German minority in 1921 counted 18.8% of the overall population (with 175 771 Germans still remaining in Polish areas), while in 1931 it counted 9.6% (104 992 Germans remaining).
Other more detailed estimates below:

Voivodes 
Stefan Łaszewski – 19 October 1919 – 2 July 1920
Jan Brejski – 2 July 1920 – 24 March 1924
Stanisław Wachowiak – 24 October 1924-August 1926
Mieczysław Seydlitz – August 1926 – October 1926
Kazimierz Młodzianowski – 12 October 1926 – 4 July 1928
Wiktor Wrona-Lamot – 28 August 1928 – 18 November 1931
Stefan Kirtiklis – 18 November 1931 – 14 July 1936
Władysław Raczkiewicz – 16 July 1936 – 30 September 1939

Notes

References 
 Maly rocznik statystyczny 1939, Nakladem Glownego Urzedu Statystycznego, Warszawa 1939 (Concise Statistical Year-Book of Poland, Warsaw 1939).

 
Former voivodeships of the Second Polish Republic